The 2020–21 ACF Fiorentina season was the club's 94th season in existence and the club's 17th consecutive season in the top flight of Italian football. In addition to the domestic league, Fiorentina participated in this season's edition of the Coppa Italia. The season covered the period from 3 August 2020 to 30 June 2021.

Players

Squad information

Appearances include league matches only

Transfers

In

Out

Loans out

Pre-season and friendlies

Competitions

Overview

Serie A

League table

Results summary

Results by round

Matches
The league fixtures were announced on 2 September 2020.

Coppa Italia

Statistics

Appearances and goals

|-
! colspan=14 style="background:#9400D3; color:#FFFFFF; text-align:center"| Goalkeepers

|-
! colspan=14 style="background:#9400D3; color:#FFFFFF; text-align:center"| Defenders

|-
! colspan=14 style="background:#9400D3; color:#FFFFFF; text-align:center"| Midfielders

|-
! colspan=14 style="background:#9400D3; color:#FFFFFF; text-align:center"| Forwards

|-
! colspan=14 style="background:#9400D3; color:#FFFFFF; text-align:center"| Players transferred out during the season

Goalscorers

References

External links

ACF Fiorentina seasons
Fiorentina